Senator Newell may refer to:

Edward D. Newell (1810–1888), Louisiana State Senate
Graham S. Newell (1915–2008), Vermont State Senate
Linda Newell (born 1957), Colorado State Senate

See also
Asa T. Newhall (1846–1937), Massachusetts State Senate